Neferteri Sheba Shepherd (born September 8, 1980, now Neferteri Plessy) is an African-American model and actress. She is Playboy's Playmate of the Month for July 2000 and has appeared in Playboy videos.

Shepherd is also a mother of two, a blogger and a TV host; her spare time is spent managing Single Mom Planet. "Single Mom Planet is meant to empower single moms such as myself to live a dynamic life that they love," she has explained. "We host events so moms can meet and share advice. We also have a website where moms can get recipes, exercise tips and advice on dating, relationships and raising their kids."

Biography 

Born in New Orleans, Louisiana, Neferteri Shepherd relocated to Los Angeles in pursuit of her dreams of becoming an actress and model. Her great ambition led to her being booked as a leading model on the American Music Awards, on the runways of Baby Phat and Stuff Magazine, and featured in a National Ad Campaign with the athletic apparel company Privacy Wear. She has also been featured in the pages of Maxim magazine.

Neferteri's screen appearances include co-hosting VH1's Sex & Rock Roll, she is the leading lady in platinum selling recording artist music videos (50 Cents to Usher) and her commercial appearances include an Arby's spot that is presently airing nationally, sitcoms include UPN's The Parkers and FOX's Method and Red, and the movie "Hair Show," starring Monique. She's also the featured actress for the new 2005 Starz network imaging campaign.

Also participated in the game Street Racing Syndicate (2004), where shot for the winning video with dancing girls.

She has now turned her sights squarely on producing television shows. A talent that is being mentored by Hollywood producer Rushion McDonald of Nu-Opp Inc. Neferteri has two shows in development and a pilot being shot at the WB. The name of the pilot show is "Mobile Home Disaster," a reality makeover show for trailer park homes.

Filmography

1999 - The Parkers (Receptionist)
2003 - A Miami Tail (Nike)
2004 - Hair Show (Ria)
2004 - Method & Red (-)
2005 - Mobile Home Disaster (-)
2008 - The Candy Shop 	(Diamond Ring Client)
2009 - One Story (Jessica)
2015 - The Man in 3B (Cain's Girl #2)

References

External links
 
 

Living people
1980 births
People from New Orleans
African-American Playboy Playmates
2000s Playboy Playmates
African-American female models
African-American actresses
American film actresses
Actresses from Louisiana
21st-century African-American people
21st-century African-American women
20th-century African-American people
20th-century African-American women